

Offseason

Recruiting

Exhibition

News and notes

October
Taylor Wasylk had 5 points (2 goals, 3 assists) in the BC victories on Oct. 8 and 9. She scored her first collegiate goal on Oct. 8 vs. Colgate. She had a four-point game the following day against Syracuse.
Taylor Wasylk scored a goal and assisted on Kelli Stack’s goal as the Eagles tied Quinnipiac 3-3. Against Brown, she scored twice as the Eagles prevailed by a 5-2 mark. She fired 13 shots on goal in the two contests and earned a +6 plus/minus rating. For her efforts, she was recognized as Hockey East Rookie of the Week for the third consecutive week. Wasylk's honor marks the first time in Boston College Eagles women's ice hockey history that a player has won a league award for three consecutive weeks.
Molly Schaus recorded her 60th win in BC’s 4-1 win over Vermont
Of the five new freshmen on this year’s team, through October 24, three have scored goals, four have scored assists, and all five have started.
The last time BC went 4-0 to start a season was in the 2007-08 season. Had BC won against Quinnipiac on Friday Oct. 22, it would have been the first time in program history that the team opened the season at 5-0.
October 24: In the 5-2 victory over Brown, three BC players scored their first goals: Andrea Green, Ashley Mothwerwell, and Blake Bolden. In addition to the goal, Blake Bolden tallied two assists in the win against Brown.
Kelli Stack ended the Eagles series against the Connecticut Huskies with four points (two goals, two assists). She scored a goal on October 30 and had a hand in all three goals on October 31 (one goal compared to two assists).
October 31: Molly Schaus registered her 20th career shutout and 62nd win.
In the first eight games of the season, Kelli Stack has scored a goal in seven out of eight games  She finished October 2010 with fifteen points (nine goals, six assists) in eight games for Boston College. Stack started every game at center and has accumulated points in every game. She finished the month leading the Eagles in points, goals, power play goals, and shorthanded goals. On October 31, she was involved in all three goals against Connecticut (one goal, two assists). She was part of all three goals scored at Vermont on October 15 (two goals, one assist). Against the Syracuse Orange (on October 9), Stack scored a hat trick.

November
On November 20, 2010, Kelli Stack scored a hat trick against rival Boston University. It was the second hat trick of the season, and third of her career. Eight days later, Stack scored two goals in under sixty seconds (the first goal was scored at 17:12 in the third period, and the second was scored at 17:58), as BC beat New Hampshire by a 3-1 tally.

December
December 5: Molly Schaus recorded 25 saves in her 11th season win against Harvard at Conte Forum. Freshman Melissa Bizzari put in her best performance of the season. She scored a goal and two assists against Harvard. Kelli Stack scored three goals against Harvard for her third hat trick of the season, fourth in her career. The 6-2 win was the second time BC has scored six goals this season. It was the Eagles fifth all-time win against Harvard. The last Eagles victory over the Crimson was February 10, 2009 to become Beanpot Champions.
December 9: Seniors Kelli Stack and Molly Schaus, sophomore Blake Bolden, and freshmen Meagan Mangene and Taylor Wasylk were among forty players who were invited to try out for the United States National Women's ice hockey team.

January
January 30: In a 2-1 defeat of Northeastern, goaltender Molly Schaus earned her first career assist. She stopped a slapshot which rebounded to Kelli Stack. Stack skated the length of the rink and scored a shorthanded goal, which was also the game winner.

February
On February 8, 2011, with two points in the game against Boston University in the first round of the 2011 Beanpot Tournament, Kelli Stack accumulated 199 points in her career and broke BC's all-time career points record, becoming the new program leader.
February 15: The Eagles won their fourth Beanpot by defeating the Harvard Crimson by a 3-1 score.

March
March 5: Kelli Stack scored the game-winning goal in overtime as the Eagles advanced to the Hockey East championship game.

Regular season

Standings

Schedule

Conference record

Postseason

Hockey East tournament

2011 Hockey East All-Tournament team

NCAA tournament

Regional matches
It was the first time that BC beat Minnesota in school history.

Frozen Four - Louis J. Tullio Arena, Erie, Pennsylvania

Awards and honors
Melissa Bizzari, Hockey East Rookie of the Week (Week of March 7)
Meagan Mangene, 2011 All-Hockey East Honorable Mention
Meagan Mangene, 2011 Hockey East All-Rookie Team
Mary Restuccia, Beanpot MVP
Mary Restuccia, 2011 All-Hockey East Second team
Molly Schaus, Runner-up: Hockey East Goaltender of the Month (October 2010)
Molly Schaus, BC, Runner-Up, Hockey East Goaltender of the Month (November 2010) 
Molly Schaus, 2011 Patty Kazmaier Award Nominee
Molly Schaus, Bertagna Goaltending Award
Molly Schaus, 2011 All-Hockey East First Team
Kelli Stack, Hockey East Pure Hockey Player of the Month (October 2010) 
Kelli Stack, Hockey East Pure Hockey Player of the Month, November 2010
Kelli Stack, Player of the Week (Week of November 1)
Kelli Stack, Player of the Week (Week of March 7)
Kelli Stack, 2011 Patty Kazmaier Award Nominee
Kelli Stack, 2011 All-Hockey East First Team
Taylor Wasylk, Hockey East Pro Ambitions Rookie of the week (Week of October 11)
Taylor Wasylk, Hockey East Pro Ambitions Rookie of the week (Week of October 18)
Taylor Wasylk, Hockey East Pro Ambitions Rookie of the week (Week of October 25)
Taylor Wasylk, Runner-up: Hockey East, Pro Ambitions Rookie of the Month (October 2010)
Danielle Welch, Player of the Week (Week of February 7, 2011)
Danielle Welch, 2011 All-Hockey East Honorable Mention
Hockey East Team of the Week (Week of February 7, 2011)
Hockey East Team of the Week (Week of March 7, 2011)

Postseason
Army ROTC Three Stars Award: Kelli Stack, Boston College
Scoring Champion: Kelli Stack, Boston College
Cammi Granato Award (Hockey East Player of the Year): Kelli Stack, Boston College
Hockey East tournament MVP: Kelli Stack
Katie King, Finalist, 2011 AHCA Women's Ice Hockey Division I Coach of the Year

All-Rookie team
D: Meagan Mangene, Boston College

All-Americans
 Molly Schaus, 2011 First Team All-America selection
 Kelli Stack, 2011 Second Team All-America selection

New England hockey awards
 Kelli Stack, New England Women's Player of the Year
 Mary Restuccia, New England Women's Division I All-Stars
 Molly Schaus, New England Women's Division I All-Stars
 Kelli Stack, New England Women's Division I All-Stars

CWHL draft picks
The following Eagles were claimed in the 2011 CWHL Draft.

See also
2009–10 Boston College Eagles women's ice hockey season
2010–11 Boston College Eagles men's ice hockey season
2010–11 Hockey East women's ice hockey season

References

B
B
Boston College Eagles women's ice hockey seasons
NCAA women's ice hockey Frozen Four seasons
Boston College Eagles women's ice hockey season
Boston College Eagles women's ice hockey season
Boston College Eagles women's ice hockey season
Boston College Eagles women's ice hockey season